The Port of Salif is a key Yemeni sea port. It is located in Hudeidah Governorate on the Red Sea. The port is used to export bulk salt and import the wheat, corn and the bulk material vessels.

Location 
The Port of Al-Salif locates at 15.2833N, 42.6833E, to the northwest of Hodeidah City. It is 60 km far from Hodeidah longitudinally. The port is a natural deep water port protected by Kamaran Island as natural protection from the waves.

See also 

 Yemen Red Sea Ports Corporation
 Yemen Gulf of Aden Ports Corporation
 Yemen Arabian Sea Ports Corporation
 Hudaydah Port

References 

Ports and harbours of Yemen
Transport in Yemen
Government of Yemen
Al Hudaydah Governorate